The 1980 United States Senate election in Louisiana was held on September 13, 1980. Incumbent Democrat Russell B. Long won the primary with 57.64% of the vote and avoided a runoff.

Primary election

Candidates
Russell B. Long, incumbent United States Senator
Woody Jenkins, State Representative
Jerry C. Bardwell
Robert M. Ross
Naomi Bracey

Results

See also
 1980 United States Senate elections

References

1980
Louisiana
United States Senate